Dudley Christopher Carter (May 6, 1891 – April 7, 1992) was an artist and woodcarver from the Pacific Northwest. His works are on display in the U.S. states of Washington, Oregon and California. There are also works of his on display in Japan and Germany, as well as a private collection in Israel 

Carter was a participant in the "Art in Action" program during the 1940 season of the Golden Gate International Exposition (GGIE). He was also the first King County, Washington Parks and Recreation artist-in-residence when he was 96 years old.

Early life

Carter was born to a pioneer family of Scottish-descent on May 6, 1891, in New Westminster, Canada. His father was originally from Barbados, and his mother was from Quebec; they came west in 1891, shortly before Dudley was born. He was a timber cruiser and forest engineer most of his life, exploring and mapping Pacific Northwest wilderness. The chief inspiration for Carter's art was his childhood among the Kwakiutl and Tlingit indigenous people. He moved to Washington state in 1928.

Diego Rivera and City College of San Francisco

Carter was a participant during 1940, in the "Art in Action" exhibitions during the 1939–1940 Golden Gate International Exposition (GGIE) on Treasure Island. During that time he became a friend of Diego Rivera, who included Carter three separate times in his mural Marriage of the Artistic Expression of the North and of the South on this Continent and once in the Pan American Unity mural. Rivera said the following about Carter:

There are three works by Carter on the City College of San Francisco Ocean Campus, The Ram (sometimes called the Mountain Ram), Goddess of the Forest, and The Beast. Dudley had donated The Ram because he knew it was the school mascot and it had been part of the Golden Gate International Exposition's Arts in Action exhibition. The Ram sculpture stood outside on the campus periodically changing locations from time to time, students would coat it in paint with campus colors red and white. Sometimes rival schools would repaint The Ram in their own school colors. By 1980, The Ram had many layers of paint and damage and in spring of 1983 it was restored by Carter with use of a pick axe and its original, natural redwood. Currently located in the lobby of Conlan Hall, on the Ocean Campus. 

The Goddess of the Forest is another redwood sculpture created during GGIE. It is very large, standing at 26 feet tall, and had a girth at the base of 21 feet. For years this piece was located at Golden Gate Park, until 1986, when it began to show distress and decay. It was then moved to CCSF, to an indoor location awaiting restoration.

Clackamas

In 1979, at the age of eighty-eight, Carter was commissioned to carve three large cedars for the Clackamas Town Center shopping mall, located in the southeastern part of the Portland metropolitan area in Oregon. The trees selected for the project came from Mount St. Helens six months before the volcanic eruption of 1980 that eliminated much of the forest. Carter lived in a small trailer on the shopping center's construction site while carving the trees. In 1981, the sculptures were moved into the central court next to a skating rink, where they remained until a major remodel of the center in 2004. The next year they were transferred to the Columbia Gorge Interpretive Center Museum.

Influence in Washington state
When ninety-six years old, Carter became the first artist-in-residence of the King County Parks and Recreation Department.

He had a home at 7447 159th Place NE, Redmond, Washington. Located in Slough House Park, the house was named "Haida House Studio". 

After a brief illness the artist died in his sleep at the Slough House residence, just a month short of his 101st birthday on April 7, 1992. He is buried near Stave Falls, B.C. Slough House is now owned by the city of Redmond. The artist bequest included his art studio, fashioned in the manner of a native Haida dwelling, and a group of monumental wood sculptures of the sort that brought the sculptor to international prominence.

Upon his death, Congressman Rod Chandler honored Carter with remarks in the Congressional Record in 1992.

Personal life 
Carter was married to Teresa Williams Carter (née Easthope) in December 20, 1919 in Vancouver, British Columbia. Together they had a daughter named Mavis Anne. Their marriage ended when Teresa Carter died on July 20, 1975, at age 81 in West Vancouver.

Works

Further reading

References

External links 

 Photographs from CCSF of Dudley C. Carter during GGIE and during The Ram restoration in 1983

American woodcarvers
1891 births
1992 deaths
American centenarians
Men centenarians
People from Redmond, Washington
People of the New Deal arts projects
Works Progress Administration workers
Artists from Oregon
Canadian emigrants to the United States